The International Association for Near-Death Studies (IANDS) is a nonprofit organization based in Durham, North Carolina in the United States, associated with near-death studies.
The Association was founded in the US in 1981, in order to study and provide information on the phenomena of the near death experience (NDE). Today it has grown into an international organization, which includes a network of more than 50 local interest groups, and approximately 1,200 members worldwide. Local chapters, and support groups, are established in major U.S cities. IANDS also supports and assists near-death experiencers (NDErs) and people close to them. In one of its publications the organization has formulated its vision as one of building "global understanding of near-death and near-death-like experiences through research, education, and support".

History

The organization was originally known as the Association for the Scientific Study of Near-Death Phenomena. This group was founded by researchers John Audette, Bruce Greyson, Kenneth Ring and Michael Sabom in 1978.<ref name="IANDS Fact Sheet">[http://iands.org/about/about-iands27/fact-sheet.html "IANDS Fact Sheet, as of December 2010]. Accessed 2012-02-09.</ref>Greyson, Bruce. "An Overview of Near-Death Experiences". Missouri Medicine, November/December 2013 The first president of this association was John Audette, who later served as executive director. In 1981 the organization changed its name to the International Association for Near-Death Studies (also known as IANDS). A headquarter was established in Connecticut, and was affiliated with the University of Connecticut, Storrs.Ziegler, Jan. "Near-death Experiences Deemed Worthy Of Serious Research". The Chicago Tribune, October 06, 1985 Offices were administered by Nancy Evans Bush, who later served as executive director, and president.

Past presidents of IANDS also include researchers Kenneth Ring and Bruce Greyson, who served as Presidents in the early 1980s. The presidencies of Ring and Greyson (1981–83) marked the beginning of professional research on the topic of NDE's, leading up to the establishment of the Journal of Near-Death Studies in 1982. Greyson later served as director of research at IANDS. During the presidency of John Alexander, in 1984, the organization held its first research conference in Farmington (CT).

Elizabeth Fenske took over the presidency from John Alexander in 1986, and was involved in the relocation of the main office to Philadelphia in the late 1980s.Detjen, Jim. "Near-death Experiences Deemed Worthy Of Study". The Chicago Tribune, January 08, 1989 The end of the decade also marked a period of outreach for IANDS. Local branches were established in major U.S cities, and the first national IANDS conference was held at Rosemont College (PA) in 1989. By the early nineties Nancy Evans Bush had taken over as president of the association. In the period from 1992 to 2008 IANDS-offices were administered by external service providers.

In 2008, during the presidency of Diane Corcoran, the organization established its current headquarter in Durham, North Carolina. Later activity includes development of the IANDS website, and continued  maintenance of support groups and members.

Publications and archives

IANDS is responsible for the publishing of the Journal of Near-Death Studies,IANDS Journal of Near-Death Studies. Accessed 2011-02-06.Williams, Daniel. "At the Hour Of Our Death". TIME Magazine. Friday, Aug. 31, 2007Lichfield, Gideon. "The Science of Near-Death Experiences. Empirically investigating brushes with the afterlife". The Atlantic, April 2015 originally known as "Anabiosis". The only scholarly journal in the field of Near-Death Studies. It is peer-reviewed, and is published quarterly.

Another publication is the quarterly newsletter Vital Signs, first published in 1981. The organization also maintains an archive of near-death case histories for research and study.

Conferences

IANDS arranges conferences on the topic of Near-death Experiences. The conferences are held in major U.S cities, almost annually. The first meeting was a medical seminar at Yale University, New Haven (CT) in 1982. This was followed by the first clinical conference in Pembroke Pines (FL), and the first research conference in Farmington (CT) in 1984. Each conference is usually defined by the formulation of a conference theme. In 2004 the conference theme was "Creativity from the light".

The organization also collaborates with academic locations in regard to hosting conferences. In 2001 the IANDS conference was held at Seattle Pacific University. In 2006 IANDS collaborated with University of Texas M.D. Anderson Cancer Center, which became the first medical institution to host the annual IANDS conference. The papers from the conference were later compiled and published in The handbook of near-death experiences: thirty years of investigationIn 2013 the conference was held in Arlington, Virginia, and the theme was "Loss, Grief, and the Discovery of Hope: Stories and Studies from Near-Death Experiences." The 2014 conference was held in Newport Beach (Calif.) and gathered the attention from the newspaper The Epoch Times, which produced several reports from the meeting.

References

 Further reading 
 Holden JM, Greyson B, James D, editors. (2009) The Handbook of Near-Death Experiences: Thirty Years of Investigation''. Santa Barbara, CA: Praeger/ABC-CLIO

External links 
 
 IANDS España. IANDS Spain
 Netzwerk Nahtoderfahrung IANDS Germany
 Netwerk NDE IANDS Netherlands

Near-death experiences
Transpersonal psychology
Parapsychology
Non-profit organizations based in North Carolina
International scientific organizations
Organizations based in Durham, North Carolina
International organizations based in the United States
501(c)(3) organizations